The NT Pearls aka Darwin Airport Resort Territory Pearls are a nationally competing women's field hockey team based in the Northern Territory of Australia.

References

Australian field hockey clubs
field hockey
Women's field hockey teams in Australia
Field hockey clubs established in 1993
Sports teams in the Northern Territory